Here is a list of schools, colleges and universities in Bokaro.

Schools 

 Bokaro Ispat Vidyalaya, Sector 9D
 Bokaro Ispat Vidyalayas
 DAV Public School, Sector IV
 Delhi Public School, Bokaro
 Guru Gobind Singh Public School, Sector V
 Holy Cross School, Bokaro

Colleges 

 Bokaro Steel City College

References 

Bokaro
Education in Bokaro Steel City
Jharkhand-related lists